Sam Wilson, known as One String Sam, was an American Detroit blues musician, who specialised in playing the diddley bow. Details of his life are scant, but he recorded two tracks described as an "eerie, spooky, and riveting version of country blues".  He also performed at the 1973 and 1974 Ann Arbor Blues and Jazz Festivals.

Biography
Little is known of the life of One String Sam, apart from his limited recording and concert performances. He was largely a street entertainer, based in Detroit, Michigan.  In the same city, Joe's Record Shop was founded in 1945 and then based on 3530 Hastings Street.  It was owned by Joe Von Battle, and he sold records and recorded music with such as John Lee Hooker, C. L. Franklin and Aretha Franklin. One day, in 1956, One String Sam entered the Shop and, with Battle's assistance, he recorded two distinctive tracks.  These were "I Need a Hundred Dollars" and "My Baby, Oooo." Sam accompanied his singing by playing a home-made diddley bow. The musical instrument had an electric guitar pickup fitted and Sam played the fretless, one string instrument utilising an empty baby food jar as a slide. One String Sam used the open jar as a makeshift echo chamber when vocalising into the recording microphone. AllMusic noted that the two tracks presented "an eerie, spooky, and riveting version of country blues". The two sides were issued on a 10" shellac disc on Battle's own J-V-B Recordings record label. In August 2014, a vinyl copy of the original single was sold at an online auction for $1922.

After the recording was completed, One String Sam returned to playing on Detroit's streets for a number of years.  His eventual absence from doing so was noted, although it was subsequently discovered that he had relocated to Inkster, Michigan.

In 1973, One String Sam was persuaded to perform at the Ann Arbor Blues and Jazz Festival. He was recorded performing two tracks, "I Need a Hundred Dollars" and "I Got to Go." These two sides were released on Motor City Blues / Please Mr. Foreman, on Schoolkids' Records.

There are sources which suggest that One String Sam also performed at the Festival the following year. The peculiarity was that it was staged at the campus of St. Clair College in Windsor, Ontario, Canada, due to problems in obtaining the necessary permit in Ann Arbor itself. The Ann Arbor Sun reported in September 1974, that One String Sam's presence was his second appearance at the Festival. After this, details of One String Sam's ongoing existence are not recorded.

Live performances

Discography

Single

Compilation album appearances

See also
List of Detroit blues musicians

References

External links
"I Need a Hundred Dollars" @ YouTube
My Baby, Oooo @ YouTube

Year of birth missing
Year of death missing
American blues singers
Detroit blues musicians
20th-century American singers
20th-century American male singers